British Guiana (now Guyana) competed at the 1960 Summer Olympics in Rome, Italy.

Results by event

Athletics
Men's 200 metres
Clayton Glasgow

Men's 400 metres
Clayton Glasgow

Men's 800 metres
Ralph Gomes

Men's 5,000 metres
George De Peana

Women's High Jump
Brenda Archer

Boxing
Men's Light-Heavyweight
Carl Crawford

References
sports-reference
Official Olympic Reports

Nations at the 1960 Summer Olympics
1960
Sport in British Guiana
Summer Olympics